The Bolivian Mennonite gas-facilitated rapes refers to mass serial rapes by a gang of men over at least four years in the Bolivian Mennonite settlement of Manitoba Colony. At least nine male members of the colony sprayed a veterinary sedative through window screens to render whole households unconscious. They then entered homes and raped the residents, particularly women and girls (but also small children). The minimum number of known victims stands at 151. Many victims were raped on multiple occasions. The youngest victim was three years old, the oldest was 65. Multiple victims were pregnant and one delivered an extremely premature baby after going into labor following a rape. There are believed to have been both adult and child male victims as well, but none were publicly identified. The perpetrators were in some cases blood relations of the victims, thus the crimes included incestuous abuse. 

The victims awoke with, variously, bruising, bleeding, semen deposits, torn clothing, missing clothing, dried grass, rope burns, or dirty handprints on their bodies, but could not clearly remember what happened due to the anesthetic's effect on short-term memory. Apparent dreams, brief impressions, "head-thumping stupor," and inability to react were also reported. The series of mystery attacks were thus initially attributed to Satan, demons, or phantoms; a popular name for the crimes is ghost rapes of Bolivia. A culture of modesty, privacy and/or secrecy initially prevented victims from communicating about their experiences, even amongst household members and families.  

The case is somewhat poorly documented in part because the insular Mennonite community chooses to be socially and culturally isolated, because few if any of the Plautdietsch-speaking victims know Bolivian Spanish, and because general education in the community is minimal and sexual education is poor or non-existent, preventing the women of the community from effectively documenting the attacks. 

The initial series of rapes was interrupted when two of the perpetrators were caught breaking and entering in June 2009. They implicated seven others within the Manitoba Colony community of about 2,500 people. The culprits stated they had been committing the rapes since 2005. The men were turned over to Bolivian law enforcement for prosecution. 

The men arrested, with their ages in 2009:

 Jacob Neugdorf Enss, age 36
 Jacob Wiebe Wall, age 24
 Franz Dick Wall, age 21
 David Guenther Banman, age 21
 Abraham Peters Dick, age 18
 Jacob Wiebe Knelsen, age 41
 Johan Bolt Ham, age 18
 Peter Wiebe Wall, age 46
 Jacob Wiebe Lowen, age 23
 Peter Friesen Neufeld, age 38
 Heinrich Knelsen Klassen, 27

The veterinarian who supplied the anesthetic gas, Peter Wiebe Wall, was sentenced to 12 years in prison. Seven convicted rapists were sentenced to 25 years each. The ninth accused man, Jacob Neudorf Enns, escaped prison and remained a fugitive as of 2011.

Many residents of the colony now have steel doors and window bars on their homes.

The story inspired a book and a film.

The "ghost rapes of Bolivia" may be part of a larger pattern of systemic sexual and incestual abuse within the Mennonite Old Colonies.

See also 
 Drug-facilitated sexual assault

References 

2000s in Bolivia
Canadian diaspora in South America
Mennonitism in Bolivia
Sexual abuse scandals in Evangelicalism
Mass sexual assault
Drug-facilitated sexual assault